WSDZ (1260 AM) is a radio station licensed to Belleville, Illinois, and serving the Greater St. Louis radio market.  It is owned and operated by Relevant Radio, Inc. WSDZ carries a Catholic talk and teaching radio format supplied by the Relevant Radio network. WSDZ, along with 1120 KMOX, are responsible for activation of the St. Louis area Emergency Alert System.

By day, WSDZ is powered at 20,000 watts.  But at night, to avoid interfering with other stations on AM 1260, it reduces power to 5,000 watts.  It uses a directional antenna at all times.  The studios are located on Weber Hill Road in St. Louis.  The transmitter is off Schuleter Germaine Road in Belleville.  Programming is also heard on 99-watt FM translator 95.1 MHz K236CS in St. Louis.

History 

The station signed on in July 1947 as WIBV "Belleville's Voice."  It was a daytimer, broadcasting on 1060 kHz with 250 watts of power.  WIBV was owned by Belleville Broadcasting Co.

WIBV aired various types of music, and would broadcast high school sports into the Metro-East area for many years, until the mid-1990s, when it became a talk radio station.  The call sign switched to WSDZ when it began broadcasting Children's Radio programming as a network affiliate of Radio Disney on May 22, 1998.  At that point, the talk programming moved over to 550 KSD, which became KTRS in early 1997.

On August 13, 2014, Radio Disney announced it would sell nearly all of its owned-and-operated stations including WSDZ.  Radio Disney said it wanted to focus more on the network's programming, co-branded events, and digital outlets.

Disney originally planned to take the stations dark on September 26, 2014. However, Disney changed plans at the last minute, and all stations would remain on the air, continuing to broadcast Radio Disney programming until each were sold.  Radio Disney planned to keep only one of its stations, its outlet at 1110 AM in Los Angeles, now KRDC.

On September 15, the Salem Media Group said it would acquire the last five Radio Disney owned-and-operated stations for sale (including WSDZ) for $2.225 million. WSDZ was acquired through Caron Broadcasting, Inc., for $275,000. The sale of WSDZ was completed on December 18, 2015.

On December 11, 2015, Radio Disney programming went off the air and WSDZ went silent, pending its new format.  On December 22, 2015, WSDZ signed back on the air with a new conservative talk format as "1260 AM The Answer".  Most of the programming came from the co-owned Salem Radio Network.

On October 30, 2017, WSDZ changed from conservative talk (which moved to sister station 1380 KXFN).  It began playing urban gospel music, branded as "Praise 95.1 & 1260".

On November 14, 2019, the station was sold to Immaculate Heart Media, Inc., and became an affiliate of the co-owned Relevant Radio network.  The programming included Catholic talk and teaching shows.

References

External links 

 

Belleville, Illinois
Relevant Radio stations
Radio stations established in 1947
1947 establishments in Illinois
Former subsidiaries of The Walt Disney Company
SDZ